The Mayurapada Central College is  a college in Dambadeniya electorate of Kurunegala district in north western Province of Sri Lanka.It is a famous school. Mayurapada Central College was started in 1944 as one of the Central Colleges that were created during the 1940s according to the concept of the pioneer, Dr. C. W. W. Kannangara, "The Father of Free Education" of Sri Lanka.

Mayurapada central college is up coming school in Kurunegala district and there are classes up 6 to 13. Most of student enter this school by passing the grade 5 scholarship exam.It was started in 1944.01.05 First principle was Mr.G.Jayaseena. When the school started there were 69 students and 06 teachers.  
]

Notable alumni 
 Nuwandhika Senarathne.
 Rangana Herath.
 Somathilaka Dissanayake.
 Somarathna Dissanayake.......

References

External links
 Mayurapada Central College     Senuka Hansira Rajaguru

Schools in Kurunegala District